Robert Currie may refer to:

People
Robert Currie (cricketer) on List of English cricketers (1851–1860)
Robert Currie (curler) on List of teams on the 2014–15 World Curling Tour
Bob Currie (1918–1988; born as Robert Frank Currie), British motorcyclist
Bob Currie (footballer) (born 1884, as Robert Currie), British soccer player

Fictional characters
Bob Currie, a fictional character from Schitt's Creek, see List of Schitt's Creek episodes

See also
Robert Curry (disambiguation)
Robert (disambiguation)
Bob (disambiguation)
Currie (disambiguation)